Curt's Famous Meats (also known as Curt's Meat Market or shortened to Curt's) is a meat market located on East Truman Road in Independence, Missouri.  Although it is in Independence, they are a known part of Kansas City-style barbecue history. Their products have won over 35 local and national barbecue awards, including their eight American Royal wins. They serve a variety of meats, ranging from common livestock and poultry to seafood and even frog legs. They also act as a small retail store, selling snacks and house hold items on one side of the store. Curt's currently has a clientele from all across the United States.

History 
Curtis Jones and his wife, Hazel Jones, originally owned a meat market called Bristol Market in Independence, Missouri. In 1947 Curtis and his wife moved their business to a nearby produce market and renamed it Curt's Market. Since its founding, it has been active in the Maywood community's history, in which it resides. The store also has a history of award-winning meat products that has stemmed from Kansas City's already long history of barbecue.  Harry S. Truman and his wife, Bess Truman, are some of Curt's most notable customers; Truman lived about one mile from the market and frequented it often. Since its founding, The store has also been visited by every mayor of Independence, Missouri.  Curtis Jones owned and operated the store until 1989, when he decided to sell it. He was initially hesitant about selling the store to a woman, but Donna Pittman, the current owner,  convinced him to do so. The name of the market was changed to Curt's Famous Meats in 2004.

Current operations

The store has a staff that is predominately female. They are known locally as the Lady Meat Cutters, although they do have a few male meat cutters.

The store holds a small Socrates Café organized by Van Horn High School. They have met every spring through summer since 2009. There, students, teachers, and Pittman discuss local and national events and issues using the socratic method of discussion. Local political faces have also joined in discussions, including Independence mayor Don Reimal.

Awards
Curt's Famous Meats has many awards, both locally and nationally, and has been recognized for its performance as a small business.

American Royal winner: 1989, 1992, 1994, 1997, 2004, 2007, 2008, 2009, 2010 
Lenexa Barbecue winner: 1989, 1999, 2003, 2004, 2010, 2011
Blue Springs Blaze Off winner: 1990, 1992, 2003, 2004, 2005
Raytown Barbecue winner: 1989, 1991, 1996, 2002, 2006, 2008
Sedalia Barbecue winner: 2008, 2009
Tonganoxie Barbecue winner: 2004, 2007, 2008
Peculiar Barbecue winner: 2006, 2008
Laurie Barbecue winner: 2005, 2007, 2008, 2010
Sugar Creek Barbecue winner: 2010, 2011
Small Business Monthly's “25 Under 25” award: 2003

See also
Kansas City-style barbecue
List of butcher shops

References

External links
Store web site

Butcher shops
American companies established in 1947
Retail companies established in 1947
Food retailers of the United States
Shops in the United States
Companies based in Independence, Missouri
Culture of Kansas City, Missouri
1947 establishments in Missouri